The 1923–24 Cincinnati Bearcats men's basketball team represented the University of Cincinnati during the 1923–24 NCAA men's basketball season. The head coach was Boyd Chambers, coaching his sixth season with the Bearcats. The team finished with an overall record of 11–8.

Schedule

|-

References

Cincinnati Bearcats men's basketball seasons
Cincinnati Bearcats men's basketball team
Cincinnati Bearcats men's basketball team
Cincinnati Bearcats men's basketball team